List of massacres in the Byzantine Empire may refer to:

 List of massacres in Greece
 List of massacres in Turkey